Durga was an Indian Bengali language television soap opera, which aired from 8 September 2008 – 26 June 2010 on Bengali GEC Star Jalsha. The show starred Sandipta Sen, Gourab Chatterjee and Swagata Mukherjee and Payel De in lead roles.

A spiritual sequel or a reboot of this series, Durga Durgeshwari, premiered in 2019 and ended in 2020. It starred Sampurna Mondal and Bishwarup Banerjee in the lead roles.

Plot 
It is the tale of the journey of a village belle and an ardent devotee of Goddess Durga, Durga (Sandipta Sen) who marries a mentally unwell heir, Rupam (Gourab Chatterjee), of an urban rich family. Rupam is held  captive for several years by an evil woman Damini (Swagata Mukherjee). Damini held Rupam around the waist and captured him.However, Durga's faith in the Goddess, which is  her strength helps her to cure Rupam. The Goddess (Payel De) comes to her rescue during all of Durga's challenges. Thus, Durga helps Rupam lead a normal life by defeating the foul plans of his relatives with the help of Goddess Durga.

Cast
 Sandipta Sen as Durga Roy Chowdhury, Sibnath and Jaya's daughter, Rupam's wife and an ardent devotee of Goddess Durga
 Gourab Chatterjee as Rupam Roy Chowdhury, Arindam and Jayanti's son, Durga's husband, a mentally unwell heir
 Swagata Mukherjee as Damini Roy Chowdhury, Arijit's second wife, Titli's mother, an evil lady who killed Rupam's mother and tries to harm Rupam and Durga.
 Payel De as Goddess Durga aka Sati
 Ditipriya Roy as Gauri, Child version of Goddess Durga
 Debesh Roy Chowdhury as Aniruddha Roy Chowdhury, Gayatri's husband and Damini's Sidekick
 Moyna Mukherjee as Gayatri Roy Chowdhury, Aniruddha's wife and Damini's Sidekick
 Dr. Basudev Mukhopadhyay as Arijit Roy Chowdhury, Damini's husband and Sreerup, Arup and Titli's father
 Saptarshi Roy as Sreerup Roy Chowdhury, Ketaki's husband
 Saibal Bhattacharya as Arup Roy Chowdhury, Neela's husband
 Rajat Ganguly as Arindam Roy Chowdhury, Rupam's father
 Pritha Chatterjee as Jayanti Roy Chowdhury, Rupam's mother who was killed by Damini
 June Malia as Ketaki Roy Chowdhury, Sreerup's wife
 Rupanjana Mitra as Neela Roy Chowdhury, Arup's wife 
 Debolina Dutta as Titli Roy Chowdhury, Damini and Arijit's daughter, Rupam and Durga's well wisher
 Subhrajit Dutta as Titli's love interest
 Tina Dutta as Kumkum Roy Chowdhury, Neela's daughter
 Bodhisattva Majumder as Sibnath, Durga's father
 Swagata Bose as Jaya, Durga's mother
 Sumanta Mukherjee as Narayan Choudhary, zamindar of Sonajhuri village
Anindya Pulak Banerjee as Supriyo, son of Narayan Choudhary
 Rita Dutta Chakraborty as Maya Maa, a Yogini
 Debika Mitra as a Nun who rescued Durga
 Nitya Ganguly as Kanai Kaka, servant of the Roy Chowdhury family
 Pradip Bhattacharya as Hari Kaka
 Samir Biswas as Sashadhar, priest of the Durga temple in Sonajhuri village who gave the idol of Goddess to Durga
 Sudipa Basu as Jhumur's mother
 Bimal Chakraborty as Damini's lawyer

Adaptations

References

External links
 Durga on Facebook

Bengali-language television programming in India
Indian television soap operas
2008 Indian television series debuts
2010 Indian television series endings
Indian drama television series
Star Jalsha original programming
Television shows set in Kolkata
Indian television series about Hindu deities